MAS was an Italian motorcycle manufacturer from 1920 until 1956.

MAS stood, in the context, for "Alberico Seiling Motorcycles" (Motocicli Alberico Seiling).

Seiling was an Italian constructor who developed a variety of motorbikes between 1920 and 1922, and in 1922 started commercial production. His 173 cc overhead valve (OHV) model with an external flywheel proved particularly popular.  He also produced a single-cylinder 498 cc OHV model, and from 1928 a twin-cylinder model, also with 498 cc of displacement.

In 1937 an OLHV model with a special cylinder head appeared, with a vertically mounted camshaft, the cylinder valves set horizontally in a separate chamber above the combustion chamber. The combustion mixture was premixed in this separate chamber. By excluding the valves from the combustion chamber itself it was possible to use a 15:1 compression ratio which was by the standards of the time very high. The motor was not a success, however.

Seiling sold the MAS business to the Guidetti brothers in 1938. After this he continued to produce motor cycles in his own name (Seiling: A. Scoppio S.A.) and then, in 1939, he obtained finance to establish a new motorcycle manufacturing business under the name Altea.  Altea produced a single-cylinder ohv 198 cc machine.   However, this business ended in 1941 due to the general war which had by then broken out across most of Europe.

See also 

 List of Italian companies
 List of motorcycle manufacturers

References

Defunct motorcycle manufacturers of Italy
Defunct motor vehicle manufacturers of Italy
Motorcycles by brand
Vehicle manufacturing companies established in 1920
Vehicle manufacturing companies disestablished in 1956
Italian companies established in 1920
1956 disestablishments in Italy
Milan motor companies